Pete (also called Peg Leg Pete, Bad Pete and Black Pete, among other names)  is a fictional character created by Walt Disney and Ub Iwerks of The Walt Disney Company. Pete is traditionally depicted as the villainous arch-nemesis of Mickey Mouse, and was made notorious for his repeated attempts to kidnap Minnie Mouse. Pete is the oldest continuing Disney character, having debuted in the cartoon Alice Solves the Puzzle in 1925. He originally bore the appearance of an anthropomorphic bear, but with the advent of Mickey in 1928, he was defined as a cat.

Pete appeared in 67 animated short films between 1925 and 1954, having been featured in the Alice Comedies and Oswald the Lucky Rabbit cartoons, and later in the Mickey Mouse, Donald Duck, and Goofy cartoons. During World War II, he played the long-suffering sergeant trying to make a soldier out of Donald Duck in a series of animated shorts. 

Pete's final appearance during this era was The Lone Chipmunks (1954), which was the final installment of a three-part Chip n' Dale series. He also appeared in the short films Mickey's Christmas Carol (1983), The Prince and the Pauper (1990), Mickey, Donald, Goofy: The Three Musketeers (2004), and Get a Horse! (2013).

Pete has also made many appearances in Disney comics. He appeared as Sylvester Shyster's dimwitted sidekick in the early Mickey Mouse comic strips before evolving into the main antagonist. In the Italian comics production he has been given a girlfriend, Trudy, and has come to be the central character in some stories. Pete later made several appearances in television, most extensively in Goof Troop (1992–1993) where he was given a different continuity, having a family and a regular job as a used car salesman and being a friend (albeit a poor one) to Goofy. He reprises this incarnation in 1999's Mickey's Once Upon a Christmas. Pete also appears in House of Mouse (2001–2003) as the greedy property owner who is always trying to exploit devious ways and loopholes to get the club shut down.

Although Pete is often typecast as a villain, he has shown great versatility within the role, playing everything from a hardened criminal (The Dognapper, The Lone Chipmunks and most of his depictions in comics) to a legitimate authority figure (Moving Day, Donald Gets Drafted, Mr. Mouse Takes a Trip), and from a menacing trouble maker (Building a Building, Trombone Trouble) to a victim of mischief himself (Timber, The Vanishing Private). On some occasions, Pete has even played a sympathetic character, all the while maintaining his underlying menacing nature. (Symphony Hour, How to Be a Detective) In the animated TV series Mickey Mouse Clubhouse, which is aimed at preschoolers, he is largely a friendly character, although his antics can occasionally prove an annoyance.

Theatrical cartoons

Alice Comedies

Pete first appeared in the Walt Disney-produced 1920s Alice Comedies short subject series. He first appeared in Alice Solves the Puzzle (February 15, 1925) as Bootleg Pete. His nickname was a reference to his career of bootlegging alcoholic beverages during Prohibition in the United States (1920-1933). In the cartoon, Pete's activities bring him to a beach in time to see Alice working on a crossword puzzle. Pete happens to be a collector of crossword puzzles, and identifies Alice's puzzle being a rare one missing from his collection. The rest of the short focuses on his antagonizing Alice and her drunk-on-moonshine cat Julius in order to steal it. The menacing, peg-legged bear villain commanded quite a presence on the screen and was destined to return. In various later Alice Comedies, the character again battled and competed with Alice and Julius, often under the aliases Putrid Pete and Pegleg Pete.

Oswald the Lucky Rabbit

Disney needed a villain to place against his new star Oswald the Lucky Rabbit, and Pete was introduced to his new adversary in the sixth Oswald short The Ocean Hop (September 8, 1927). Apparently inspired by Charles Lindbergh, the two enter an aeroplane race across the Atlantic Ocean. By the time producer Charles Mintz moved production of the Oswald series to his own studio, Pete had been established as the most consistently appearing supporting character to Oswald, and the character continued to appear in that role in the Oswald films directed and produced by Walter Lantz until 1937, making him essentially the only cartoon character at the time to frequently appear in shorts produced by two rival animation studios. His most notable non-Disney appearance was arguably as a captain in Permanent Wave (September 29, 1929).

Mickey Mouse and friends

After leaving the Oswald series, Disney and his team created a cat villain for their new protagonist Mickey Mouse. Originally unnamed in the cartoons and called "Terrible Tom" in a January 1930 comic strip, the villain was called Pegleg Pete by April 1930, formalizing him as a new incarnation of the pre-Mickey bad guy. Animator Norm Ferguson, known for developing Pluto, also developed Pete's character in several shorts and he was made to resemble actor Wallace Beery. 

Pete appeared as Mickey's enemy beginning with the 1928 cartoons The Gallopin' Gaucho and Steamboat Willie. While he was seen with two legs in those films, he first appeared with a peg-leg in 1930's The Cactus Kid and would speak for the first time. He would first appear in color in Moving Day (1936), which would drop the peg-leg. In the cartoons of the 1930s, Pete would be Mickey Mouse's nemesis, but would vary in professions, from an all-out outlaw (Gallopin' Gaucho, The Cactus Kid, Two-Gun Mickey) to a brutal law-enforcer (Moving Day, where Pete is a sheriff who serves Mickey and Donald Duck with an eviction notice). On the other hand, in the 1942 cartoon Symphony Hour, Pete is a sympathetic impresario who sponsors Mickey's orchestra in a concert, which goes terribly wrong but is a great success. As Mickey's popularity declined, Pete would serve as an antagonist for Donald Duck and to a lesser extent Goofy and Chip 'n' Dale.

Comics
In Disney comics, Pete is consistently depicted as a hardened criminal, who often teams up with Mickey Mouse enemies Sylvester Shyster, Eli Squinch, or the Phantom Blot. 

In a promotional strip for the Mickey Mouse comic strip in early 1930, he was announced as "Terrible Tom – The Vile Villain", but this name was never used afterwards. In the April 24, 1930 strip, Mickey refers to him as "Pegleg Pete", and the name sticks. Pete first appeared in the Mickey Mouse comic strip on April 21, 1930, in the story "Mickey Mouse in Death Valley." This appearance is the first time since the Alice Comedies that Pete has a pegleg. Floyd Gottfredson occasionally committed goofs, with the pegleg switching from Pete's right leg to his left one. In the August 26, 1930 strip, Pete's peg swaps from right to left between one panel to the next. Pete's pegleg also appears on the left in the July 11 strip, and for the week of September 3 to 9. In Gottfredson's story "The Mystery at Hidden River" (1941–42), the pegleg disappeared, with Pete having two normal legs: when Mickey expressed surprise at this, Pete described one of his legs as a new, "streamlined, modern" artificial leg.

In 1944, Walt Disney decided to retire the character from the shorts; comics historian Alberto Becattini writes that this was "partly because he was concerned that it seemed to be a case of mocking the afflicted, partly because the animators could never remember which leg was the wooden one." Pete also left the comic strip for a few years; his last appearance was in "The World of Tomorrow", which ran from July to September 1944.

However, Pete continued to appear in the comic books – in 1945, he was the heavy in the Donald Duck comic "Frozen Gold" (Four Color #62, Jan 1945) and in Mickey's "The Riddle of the Red Hat" (Four Color #79, Aug 1945). He surfaced again in a number of "giveaway" comics in 1946 and '47 – "Mickey's Christmas Trees" (Donald and Mickey Merry Christmas, 1946), "Donald and the Pirates" (Cheerios Premium #W1, 1947), "Mickey Mouse and the Haunted House" (Cheerios Premium #W4, 1947), "Mickey Mouse at the Rodeo" (Cheerios Premium #X4, 1947), "Mickey Mouse's Helicopter" (Boys and Girls March of Comics Giveaway #8, 1947) – and came back to the comic books in "Mickey Mouse and the Submarine Pirates" (Four Color #141, March 1947).

With Pete still appearing in comic books, Gottfredson brought him back to the comic strip in "Pegleg Pete Reforms" (March 1947). His last appearance in the strip was in "The Isle of Moola-La" (April-Oct 1952). From then on, he made many more appearances in the comic books.

In Mickey Mouse in Death Valley and in several subsequent storylines, Pete was portrayed as Sylvester Shyster's henchman. From 1934, he gradually started to work on his own. Sometimes, Pete also teams up with other bad guys in the Disney universe, such as Scrooge McDuck's enemies (the Beagle Boys and Magica De Spell), Mad Madam Mim, Captain Hook, and the Evil Queen. In various comics stories, his right-hand man is a skinny, bearded criminal named Scuttle. In Italian comics, his girlfriend Trudy (Trudy Van Tubb) is his frequent partner-in-crime. His cousin the "mad scientist" Portis is another, less frequent, accomplice.

In the 1943 comic strip story Mickey Mouse on a Secret Mission, he was an agent of Nazi Germany, working as the henchman of Gestapo spy Von Weasel. In the 1950 comic strip story The Moook Treasure, he is even portrayed as the Beria-like deputy chief of intelligence in a totalitarian state on the other side of the iron curtain.

His name in Italy has remained "Pietro Gambadilegno" ("Pegleg Peter"), or simply "Gambadilegno" ("Pegleg") even though it has been a long time since he was actually depicted with a pegleg in either comics or animated cartoons. In an Italian story by Romano Scarpa, "Topolino e la dimensione Delta" ("Mickey Mouse and the Delta Dimension", first published in 1959), Pete briefly removes his artificial leg, revealing his old foot-high pegleg underneath. Usually, Gambadilegno is depicted as the antagonist of Chief Seamus O'Hara ("commissario Adamo Basettoni") and Detective Casey ("ispettore Manetta") and is either a rival or a partner-in-crime of the Phantom Blot ("Macchia Nera").

Pete returned in the 2013 short Get a Horse!, and was animated as having a peg left leg.

World War II

During World War II, Pete was "drafted" by Walt Disney and appeared as the official mascot of the United States Merchant Marine. He appeared in Donald Duck's series of army films where he plays Donald's Drill Sergeant and later Sergeant and Jumpmaster. In the Mickey Mouse comic strip, he was a spy for Nazi Germany in the episode Mickey Mouse on a Secret Mission (1943), his motivation being the money.

Ancestry and family

Comic book stories have depicted Pete as being descended from a long line of villains, highwaymen and outlaws. Even historical figures such as Attila the Hun, Blackbeard, Antonio López de Santa Anna, Billy The Kid, and Cao Cao  have been included among his ancestors. His mother is known only as Maw Pete and was mentioned in the story "Donald Duck Finds Pirate Gold" by Carl Barks and Jack Hannah (first published October 1942) as a resident of Pittsburgh, Pennsylvania. Her only appearance was in "The River Pirates" (Walt Disney's Comics and Stories #336-338, published September-November 1968) by Carl Fallberg and Paul Murry. The same story introduced Li'l Pete, Black Pete's short fraternal twin brother. In December 1998, the Mickey Mouse comic strip introduced an older sister of Pete. Petula is the television host of the cooking show Petula's Pantry. She finds time, however, to seek revenge against Mickey for condemning her "baby brother" to life imprisonment.

Better-known and more enduring as characters are two figures created by Romano Scarpa for Italian Disney comics. The first, Trudy Van Tubb, was introduced in Topolino e la collana Chirikawa (published in English as The Chirikawa Necklace, first published on March 10, 1960). This female partner of Pete was presented as a childhood acquaintance of his: they are even shown as kids kidnapping Mickey when he was a baby. However, Trudy soon became Pete's girlfriend, his partner-in-crime and roommate—whenever they hold residence out of prison, that is. Their relationship seems to have evolved to a long-standing common-law marriage. This is occasionally used in contrast to Mickey's eternal engagement to Minnie Mouse and Goofy's determination to remain a bachelor. Trudy and Pete also have two hellion nephews named Pierino and Pieretto who often serve as foils for Mickey or Mickey's nephews Morty and Ferdie.

The second character to be created by Scarpa is Pete's cousin, the criminal scientist Portis (Plottigat in the original Italian version; English name first used in Walt Disney's Comics and Stories 695, 2008). Portis first appeared in Topolino e il Pippo-lupo" (published in English as The Weregoof's Curse; January 9, 1977). 

Ed Nofziger is responsible for a third recurring character, an alternative girlfriend of Pete named Chirpy Bird. She first appeared in Topolino e i piccioni "poliziotti" (Mickey Mouse and the Pidgeon Police, first published in December 1981) and starred as Pete's partner-in-crime in eight stories from 1981 to 1984. In France, she and Trudy are presented as the same character, being both renamed Gertrude, despite Trudy being a cat and Chirpy being a canary.

In Mickey Mouse Works, Pete has another cousin named Zeke. Zeke is a criminal like Pete, but is wary of his cousin's attempts to double-cross him "Just like old Times". Mickey often uses this distrust to turn the two against one-another.

In Goof Troop, Pete has a wife, Peg, and two children, PJ and Pistol. Alternatively, the comic book story "Mickey's Strange Mission" from Walt Disney's Comics & Stories #245 (1961, by Carl Fallberg and Paul Murry) suggests a cultured ancestry for Pete, giving his full name as the genteel Percy P. Percival.

In the Italian comic story of 1998, Topolino e il diario di zia Topolinda (Mickey Mouse and Aunt Melinda's diary) Pete's grandma appears, depicted as the only honest member of his family.

Television

DuckTales
In the first season of the 1987 TV series DuckTales, Pete appeared in a few episodes. However, he was portrayed as a different character in each of his appearances. Because of this, he was not always a true villain, but sometimes just a selfish individual with no evil agenda. In a few episodes, he even makes peace with Scrooge's group in the end. The various Petes appear to be their own characters, as two of them lived in different time periods, and because Scrooge never "recognizes" him, despite any previous encounters he may have had with any of the other Petes. In all of his appearances Pete was voiced by Will Ryan.

Goof Troop
In the 1992 TV series Goof Troop, Pete has a family who includes his wife Peg, their two children Pete Junior (or PJ for short) and Pistol, and their dog Chainsaw with Pete taking on a more canine-like appearance. They live next door to Goofy (who went to high school with Pete) and his son Max. In the series, Pete is often the victim of Goofy's clumsiness and mishaps, usually resulting in the destruction of his property or great personal injury. Pete owns a used-car dealership, and though no longer openly villainous, is still conniving (as well as abrasive, obnoxious, truculent and suspicious) and often exploits his good-hearted and somewhat addled friend Goofy. Often, his schemes backfire, or he feels guilty about his oafish behavior and works to set things right. His wife Peg often attempts to rid Pete of his uncouth attitude, and his son PJ is a complete opposite of his father in behavior, as he is good friends with Goofy's son Max in the series and its spin-off movies A Goofy Movie (1995) and An Extremely Goofy Movie (2000). Jim Cummings provided Pete's booming bass voice starting from that series, and to date is still the character's voice in all media. It is eventually revealed in the series' pilot episode "Forever Goof" that one of the reasons why Pete dislikes Goofy so much is that when Pete was a high school quarterback in a big football game, it was Goofy who accidentally caused Pete to fumble the ball and lose the game by hitting him in the face with a pom pom (Goofy was on the cheerleading squad).

Mickey Mouse Works and House of Mouse
After Goof Troop, Pete reverted to his evil ways on Mickey Mouse Works, where he frequently bullied the other characters and occasionally kidnapped Minnie Mouse. He would also play an average criminal (i.e. a house burglar). Then in House of Mouse, he plays the role of the evil landlord. Several episodes involved his attempts to close the club by sabotaging the show, though there were times when he helped out the crew.

Mickey Mouse Clubhouse
Pete appears in numerous episodes of Mickey Mouse Clubhouse. He maintains his protagonist and semi-antagonist role, but is significantly toned down for its preschool audience—he is less malicious and more mischievous. Viewers will find that Mickey and gang are very forgiving of Pete and his escapades. He often appears as a seller of objects the gang needs, and will give them an item in exchange for beans. He is much nicer than his previous incarnations—in one episode, he invites the group to a Halloween party; in "Pete's Beach Blanket Luau", he even invites everyone to the titular party.

While Clubhouse has a great deal of fun at Pete's expense (or "expanse", as he is the biggest and fattest character; they use his overalls for a sail in "Mickey and Minnie's Jungle Safari"), it also depicts him in a sympathetic light; he is openly sentimental in "Clarabelle's Clubhouse Carnival", not wanting to part with his "Petey doll" prizes. He even changes Baby Goofy's diaper (willingly) in "Goofy Baby".

The Carnival episode also gives us the closest approximation of Pete's weight; he is shown to be the same size and weight as Humphrey the Bear.

In Mickey's Great Clubhouse Hunt, he is the only character not invited to the Easter Egg Hunt (or so he thinks), so he tries to gatecrash, but messes up the secret word, causing the clubhouse to float away. At the end, he apologizes and is invited to the egg hunt after all. He is also revealed as the owner of Butch the Bulldog, who is friends with Mickey's dog, Pluto.

Mickey and the Roadster Racers
Pete also appears in Mickey and the Roadster Racers as a recurring character, either competing against Mickey and friends in races or as a civilian in various locales. The series also features various alter egos/relatives of Pete:

Piston Piedro in "Race for the Rigatoni Ribbon"
El Toro Pete in "Running of the Roadsters?"
Sir Lord Pete in "Ye Olde Royal Heist"
Beefeater Pete in "Tea Time Trouble!"
Captain Peterson in "The Happiest Helpers Cruise!"
Peteroni Leone in "Lights, Camera, Help!"

Mickey Mouse & The Wonderful World of Mickey Mouse
Pete appears in the 2013 Mickey Mouse cartoon series, and its 2020 spin-off The Wonderful World of Mickey Mouse. In both shows, he is designed based on his appearances in the early Mickey Mouse cartoons, complete with a peg-leg. Like Mickey Mouse Works and House of Mouse, he has reverted to his evil ways, and again his booming bass voice is provided by Jim Cummings.

Films
In the 1983 short film Mickey's Christmas Carol, an adaptation of Charles Dickens' novel A Christmas Carol featuring Disney characters, Pete was cast as the Ghost of Christmas Yet to Come, who reveals himself by removing his hood and lighting a cigar, which also lights up the engraving on Scrooge's grave, and having only one line ("Why yours, Ebenezer. The richest man in the cemetery!", in response to Scrooge's question about whose grave it was) and laughing cruelly while Scrooge struggles to escape from his open grave as the gates of Hell are opening. Pete also made a non-speaking cameo appearance as a Toontown police officer in the very final scene of Who Framed Roger Rabbit - he is viewed from the back, alongside Tom and Jerry's Spike and Horace Horsecollar in security uniforms, just before Porky Pig and Tinkerbell close the movie.  Pete later appeared in A Goofy Movie and its sequel where he was shown in a much lighter tone as these movies are based on Goof Troop. He is Goofy's best friend and confidant in the films. However, he is still arrogant and somewhat grouchy.

The Prince and the Pauper
In this Disney version of Mark Twain's The Prince and the Pauper, Pete once again played as the primary villain, this time as the English king's captain of the guard. When he saw that his ruler's life was slowly diminishing, he and his henchmen, a band of anthropomorphic weasels (from The Wind in the Willows) who now act as the king's guards, seized the opportunity to terrorize England's citizens and rob them of their goods in "favor" of the king. After kicking out a disguised Prince, whom he mistook for the peasant boy Mickey Mouse, out of his kingdom, he later receives word from one of his guards that the Prince was seen a causing a commotion in the village, as the guard claimed that he "acted like a nobleman and he had the royal ring!" Pete suddenly realizes that it was indeed the Prince he "booted out" and seizes another opportunity out of this. That night, after the king passes away, Pete finds the "phony prince" (Mickey), threatening the life of his dog, Pluto, unless Mickey follows his commands. In the village, he soon finds and captures the real Prince and takes him to the castle's dungeon to lock him up. On the day of the Prince's coronation, Pete plots to get Mickey crowned as king, though Mickey is still subservient to Pete's orders. His plan, however, is thwarted when the Prince suddenly appears in the throne room, having busted out of the dungeon and evading the guards with the help of Goofy (Mickey's peasant friend) and Donald Duck (the Prince's valet). A sudden battle in the throne room (Mickey and the Prince vs. Pete; Goofy and Donald vs. the Weasel Guards) results in Pete's defeat, as Goofy's bumbling antics cause a chandelier to fall on the weasels, bundle them together, and send them rolling towards Pete. Pete, seeing this, tries to flee but is slowed down by his ripped-down pants (courtesy of the Prince's swashbuckling skills) and tripped by both the Prince and Mickey, causing him to get rolled over and caught on the chandelier, which sends him and his men rolling through a stained glass window and falling out of the castle.

Mickey's House of Villains
In the 2002 direct-to-video House of Mouse spinoff film Mickey's House of Villains, Pete and other Disney villains' guest appearances from House of Mouse are featured. He takes part in the musical number "It's Our House Now."

The Three Musketeers
In the 2004 made-for-video animated film The Three Musketeers (with Mickey, Donald Duck, and Goofy playing the title roles), Pete again appeared under the name Peg-Leg Pete. He served as the main antagonist of the film. Here, he was the Captain of the Musketeers, aiming to take over France, with the help of his lieutenant, Clarabelle Cow, and the Beagle Boys. To do so, he must get Princess Minnie out of the way, but it proves to be difficult for him, even when he hires the film's titular trio to be her bodyguards, believing they will not do a good job protecting her. He received his own "bad guy song", using the classic music piece In the Hall of the Mountain King.

Chip 'n Dale: Rescue Rangers

Pete makes a cameo appearance in the 2022 film Chip 'n Dale: Rescue Rangers, where he was seen riding the Magic Carpet and dressed as Prince Ali from the 1992 version of Aladdin.

Video game appearances
 In the early Game Boy game Mickey's Dangerous Chase, Mickey has a present for Minnie, but Pete steals it. To get it back, Mickey must chase him through several different zones. Pete is the final (and only) boss of the game.
 Pete appears as the captain of a pirate ship in the early NES Capcom game Mickey Mousecapade (or simply Mickey Mouse). Unlike most appearances, he is not the final boss in this game. Notably, his role here was exclusive to the game's American release; in the original Japanese version, the level's boss was Captain Hook from Peter Pan.
 In Adventures in the Magic Kingdom for the NES, Pete (referred to as "Panhandle Pete") steals one of the keys needed to unlock the castle and challenges your character to a race on the Autopia attraction to get it back. Pete is only depicted in cut scenes, with the "race" itself more of a timed obstacle course featuring other cars with indistinct drivers.
 In Disney's Magical Quest, a trilogy by Capcom, Pete is the final boss of each game, personating a distinct ruler (Emperor, Baron and King). He serves as an evil ruler who terrorizes the land he reigns and often kidnaps another character. In Disney's Magical Quest 1, he kidnaps Pluto; in Disney's Magical Quest 2, he appears as the tyrant "Baron Pete" who commands the game's enemies; in Magical Quest 3, he kidnaps Donald's nephews. Mickey and, depending on the game, Minnie or Donald, are always set to defeat him. In the end of the first game he simply disappears when he is defeated. In the second game, he is sealed inside his own crystal ball which Mickey throws into the distance. In Magical Quest 3, however, after being defeated by Mickey and Donald, he eventually surrenders and promises to become a good person.
 Quackshot follows the adventures of Donald Duck as he, with the aid of his three nephews Huey, Dewey and Louie, sets out to obtain some treasure from a map he found. Pete appears as an antagonist near the end of the game, kidnapping Donald's nephews and demanding to be given the map, and must be fought immediately prior to the final stage and boss of the game.
 Mickey Mania follows Mickey Mouse, who has been catapulted back in time to his earliest appearance in Steamboat Willie. Black Pete is Mickey's archvillain throughout the entire game, all the way from his very first confrontation against Mickey in Steamboat Willie all the way to his role in then-recent 1990's The Prince and the Pauper.
 In the racing game Mickey's Speedway USA, Pete is a heavyweight racer, but gets replaced when the players selects between Ludwig Von Drake or Huey, Dewey and Louie.
 Pete appears as the main antagonist in Magical Tetris Challenge. In the game, his goal is to obtain ultimate power from Donald's mysterious purple stone, having a Weasel and the Big Bad Wolf as his henchmen.
 In Disney Think Fast, Pete appears as the final secret playable character after you've collected 30,000 points in a simple game.
 Pete is the final boss in World of Illusion Starring Mickey Mouse and Donald Duck, a character who owns a giant magical box and sets the challenge to any victims who fall into it to traverse surreal terrains and then to defeat him for escape. Some of the minor enemies may look a little bit like Pete as well (such as the spiders). It all seems to be fun and games rather than true imprisonment, as in both Mickey's and Donald's final stage act before the credits, Pete can be seen in the audience enjoying the show with a mischievous grin on his face (Mickey and Donald nearly missed the show by falling into the box).
 In Legend of Illusion Starring Mickey Mouse, Pete is incompetent king of the story, who passes his kingship to the laundry boy, Mickey and eventually fights him as a final boss to regain his throne.
 Pete is featured in the Wii game, Epic Mickey. Once again with his titular peg-leg, he first appears in the Gremlin Village as Small Pete (based on It's a Small World ride at Disneyland), he appears dressed as one of the Dutch girl dolls of the ride. He later appears as his usual self in Mean Street (based on Main Street USA), where he informs Mickey that there are many other Petes throughout the world, each themed differently depending on the zone in the game, like appearing in a Sark outfit in Tomorrow City as Petetronic and in Ventureland as Pete Pan. Pete himself (referred to as "Big Bad Pete"), acts as a self-appointed enforcer of sorts at Mean Street and is often a source of quests for the player. In Tomorrow City, which is inspired by Tomorrowland, the Sark-esque Petetronic is the boss of the level, attacking with thrown buckets of thinner, shaking the ground, and throwing his ID disk. The only way to attack Petetronic is to deflect his disk back at him which will stun him and expose his back side. Mickey can then squirt him with paint, which turns him blue and friendly, or thinner, which short-circuits him and reduces him to a MCP-like entity. In Ventureland, Pete appears as a jolly, bubbly version of himself known as "Pete Pan", named after Peter Pan, who is trapped on Skull Island until Mickey can manage to save the sprite so Pete Pan can fight off the robot version of Captain Hook like he used to. The Petes return in the sequel, Epic Mickey 2: The Power of Two, initially appearing as allies to the protagonists (except Pete Pan, who has allied with the Mad Doctor after Hook disappeared), Mickey and Oswald. However, by the end of the game, they leave with Prescott, presumably having plans for him. In the 3DS title Epic Mickey: Power of Illusion, three types of Pete enemies appear. The first type are Thwomp-like enemies with Pete's face emblazoned on it.  Mickey can use this enemy to his advantage by using a sketch of it. The second type resembles his appearance in the Mickey Mouse Clubhouse. This time, Pete uses brute strength in order to fight Mickey. The third and final type uses a spiked shell to attack Mickey. Mickey can only defeat him by using a spin attack and then a jump attack.
 Pete is featured (with an appearance like the one in Mickey Mouse Clubhouse) in the Nintendo 3DS game Disney Magical World as a character in the main city of Castleton. One of the 100 stickers required to complete the game requires the player to fulfill a request made by Pete, which results in an in-game photo of the player alongside Pete.
 Pete is a playable character in the mobile game Disney Magic Kingdoms. Before being unlocked, he is the first enemy boss in the game's main storyline. In the game he appears with his appearance in the film A Goofy Movie, also having a costume available to be created with his appearance in the short film Get a Horse!

Kingdom Hearts series

Pete is depicted as a recurring villain within the Kingdom Hearts video game series. He was originally a steamboat captain, with Mickey Mouse as his deck hand (as they were seen in Steamboat Willie), and later the captain of the Royal Musketeers until his plans for a coup were foiled by Mickey (as they were seen in The Three Musketeers). After Disney Castle was built in their world, with Mickey its new king, Pete began causing all sorts of mischief until he was banished to another dimension. He was subsequently freed by Maleficent, to whom he became indebted, and vowed to amass an army of Heartless, creatures born from the darkness of people's hearts, to return the favor.

 Prior to his service under Maleficent, Pete runs rampant through Disney Town during the world's annually held Dream Festival, entering contests while shifting between two different alter egos—superhero "Captain Justice" and antihero "Captain Dark"—in an attempt to claim the "Million Dreams Award" for himself. He instead loses to one of the game's three protagonists and player characters: Terra, Aqua, and Ventus. Since his lack of consideration for the hearts of others is made apparent through his mischief, Pete is banished to another dimension by Queen Minnie until he can learn to behave. He is released from his imprisonment by Maleficent, however, and helps her conquer the various worlds in the series' universe in return.
 Pete makes several appearances in Kingdom Hearts 358/2 Days, where he is gathering Heartless to build an army of Heartless for Maleficent. He is first seen exploring Agrabah in search of Jafar's magic lamp, but is secretly followed by Roxas and Axel of Organization XIII, who are on a mission to collect hearts. Pete eventually uncovers a secret passage leading outside the city, inadvertently leading Roxas to the Cave of Wonders. Roxas later returns with Xion to investigate the cave, but are spotted by Pete, who assumes they had come to take the lamp for themselves and fights them. After Pete is defeated, he makes a getaway. Pete reappears in Never Land where he plants several empty treasure chests across the island and sells maps leading to them to Captain Hook, knowing his greed will attract the Heartless for him to collect. However, his plans are once again foiled when Roxas slays the Heartless to collect their hearts. Pete decides to kill two birds with one stone by leading Hook to a final, gold-filled chest, which reacts to the darkness in Hook's heart and becomes a powerful Heartless that Pete hopes will defeat Roxas, though it ends up being defeated instead. Pete disappears again, vowing revenge against Roxas if they ever meet again.
 Pete makes his first appearance in the series in Kingdom Hearts II, where he first encounters the main group of protagonists—Sora, Donald, and Goofy—in front of Yen Sid's tower, and is disappointed to learn that they had previously defeated Maleficent while he was out gathering Heartless (though he does contemplate taking her place in her absence). However, Maleficent is quickly resurrected, and Pete continues his duties after updating her on what occurred in her absence, traveling to other worlds to recruit old or new villains to either join (or rejoin) their cause, or to turn them into powerful Heartless, but is  foiled by Sora and co. each time. Pete is viewed more as a nuisance than a threat by the heroes, Sora remarking that he is "not smart enough to tie his own shoes." He is nonetheless fought as a recurring boss during several portions of the game, though the strategy for beating him is different each time. Pete often incurs Maleficent's relentless annoyance and insults for his comical ineptness, despite his fierce loyalty to her. After one such incident, his yearning for going back in time to experience his wonder years as a steamboat captain again summons a portal to the past, which gives him the opportunity to put himself back in Maleficent's good graces. He goes back in time to steal his younger self's steamboat and alter the past to Maleficent's liking, but is defeated again by Sora and co., who have allied themselves with the younger Pete (who never discovers the older Pete's identity). However, Pete once again proves his worth when he brings Maleficent to the Castle That Never Was, the headquarters of Organization XIII, for them to use as a new base of operations, though he is very much aware that the Heartless will be unruly in this dark realm. In the end, he contemplates running when the castle becomes overrun with Heartless, but decides to stand by Maleficent's side to hold them off and help Sora and his friends defeat Organization XIII, though the castle is destroyed. Before the final boss of the game, Pete can be fought again as a boss within the optional Hades Paradox Cup in Olympus Coliseum.
 Pete returns in Kingdom Hearts Coded to spy on Mickey in Disney Castle, and ends up being transported into the Datascape with the King. Helping Maleficent's scheme to take over the virtual world, Pete encounters the Data Sora while helping Data Jafar and later kidnaps Data Riku, turning him into his slave through the bugs. He is later confronted at Hollow Bastion, unintentionally helping Data Sora regain his Keyblade before sicing Data Riku on him. Later, Data Sora attempts to rescue him and Maleficent from digital incarnation of Sora's Heartless before it crushes them. However, Data Riku is able to rescue them through a "rift in the data" and escort the villains back to their world.
 In Kingdom Hearts 3D: Dream Drop Distance, because of the increasing Darkness through the worlds brought on by the eventual revival of Master Xehanort, Pete manages to bypass the protective magic of the Cornerstone of Light with Maleficent. They take Minnie hostage and send a letter to King Mickey, bringing them to a confrontation in the library of the castle. After Maleficent explains her past meeting with Xehanort, they demand the Data Worlds be handed over to them. However, Pete loses Minnie when Lea arrives and scares him with a chakram. He promptly flees with his boss. Sora and Riku also battle another past incarnation of Pete, this time during his career as the corrupt captain of Princess Minnie's Royal Musketeers. He schemes to overthrow Minnie and become King himself, but his plans are foiled by the three Musketeers, Mickey, Donald and Goofy, with aid from Sora and Riku.
 Pete returns in Kingdom Hearts III along with Maleficent, but with a minor role. He is mainly seen aiding Maleficent in seeking out the mysterious black box left behind by the Keyblade Master Luxu, but to little success. In the game's ending, Pete and Maleficent are seen spying on the encounter between Luxu (in his Xigbar form), Ira, Aced, Invi and Gula, where the black box is present.

International names and voice actors

Notes

References

External links
 List of Disney shorts in which Pete makes an appearance
 
 Pete on IMDb
 Black Pete's entry in the Toonopedia

Animated characters introduced in 1925
Anthropomorphic cats
Comics characters introduced in 1930
Disney animated villains
Disney comics characters
Disney core universe characters
Fictional amputees
Fictional characters with superhuman strength
Fictional ship captains
Film characters introduced in 1925
Male characters in animation
Male characters in comics
Video game bosses
Villains in animated television series